Xinfeng Township is a rural township in Hsinchu County in northern Taiwan. It had an estimated population of 58,614 as of February 2023.

History
Xinfeng is a major industrial and manufacturing center in Hsinchu. It shares the Hsinchu Industrial Park with its neighboring town, Hukou. It is also the home of Ming Hsin University.

Geography
Xinfeng, encompassing , is bounded by the Taiwan Strait on its west, Zhubei City to the south, Hukou Township to the east and Xinwu District of Taoyuan City on the north.

Administrative divisions
The township comprises 17 villages: Fengkeng, Fuxing, Houhu, Jingpu, Potou, Puhe, Qiding, Ruixing, Shangkeng, Shanqi, Songbo, Songlin, Xhongxing, Xinfeng, Yuanshan, Zhonglun and Zhongxiao.

Education
 Minghsin University of Science and Technology

Tourist attractions
 Little Ding-Dong Science Theme Park

Transportation

Notable natives
 Hsu Hsin-ying, Chairperson of Minkuotang
 Hebe Tien. singer

References

External links

  

Townships in Hsinchu County